Narrogin was an electoral district of the Legislative Assembly in the Australian state of Western Australia from 1950 to 1989.

The district centred on the town of Narrogin in the southern part of the state. The seat was won on every occasion by the National Party.

Members

Election results

Narrogin